Count Berthold von Imhoff (January 14, 1868 – December 14, 1939), was an artist known for his religious murals and paintings. Born in Germany in 1868, Imhoff immigrated to the United States with his family and settled in Reading, Pennsylvania, where he established a successful art and fresco business. He left Reading in 1914, and made his home and studio in the St. Walburg, Saskatchewan area in Canada. From there he decorated churches in many rural villages of Saskatchewan and North Dakota as well as returning to Reading for commissioned work.

Early life
Imhoff was born in Mannheim, Germany, to Count Leopold and Rosina (Allgeier) von Imhoff. At age 12, he started studying at various European art schools including Oberwinter, Halle-an-der-Halle, and the art institute at Karlsruhe, Baden. In 1884, Imhoff won the Art Academy Award of Berlin for his painting The Glory of Emperor Frederick. $3000 was offered for the painting, but he refused, and the painting is now on display at the Lloydminster Cultural and Science Centre in Lloydminster, Saskatchewan. At age 20, Imhoff began studying figure work at the art academy at Düsseldorf.

Life in North America
In 1891, Berthold Imhoff married Matilde Johner, the daughter of Joseph Johner, who was one of his teachers at Bonndorf. Berthold Imhoff began to feel oppressed by European society, and decided to move to North America. His family settled in Reading, Pennsylvania where he established an art and fresco business. Imhoff's fame soon escalated as he travelled the eastern United States painting churches and homes of wealthy industrialists. As the eastern United States began to become an industrial powerhouse, Imhoff decided to move to Canada. Searching for a quiet, peaceful place to work on his art, Imhoff, Matilde, and six of his seven children moved to what is now St. Walburg, Saskatchewan in 1914. Once in Saskatchewan, Imhoff started painting many of the small churches which dot the prairie landscape near his home, often for free or for very little pay. In 1926, Imhoff completed what some people consider his masterpiece: the cathedral in Reading, Pennsylvania. Many of the 226 life-sized paintings were started in his studio in Saskatchewan and then transported to Reading where they were then completed by him and his family. In 1937, he was awarded a Knighthood in the Pontifical Order of St. Gregory the Great by Pope Pius XI. He died in 1939 and is buried in the St. Walburg Roman Catholic Cemetery next to his wife Matilda. A life size equestrian statue honouring Imhoff by St. Walburg artist Susan Velder is located in the village. The Imhoff Gallery which includes his studio, home and farm is now a heritage site.

Works

Imhoff decorated over 90 churches.
Examples of his work can be seen in churches at Carmel, St. Benedict, Bruno, Denzil, St. Leo, North Battleford in Saskatchewan and at the following locations.

Canada
St. Walburg & District Historical Museum (Assumption of the Blessed Virgin Mary Church)

Imhoff Museum and Art Gallery near St. Walburg, Saskatchewan

St. Peter's Cathedral in Muenster, Saskatchewan

Shrine of the Holy Rosary at Reward, Saskatchewan

Our Lady of Sorrows in Paradise Hill, Saskatchewan

Assumption Catholic Church in Marysburg, Saskatchewan

Lloydminster Cultural and Science Centre Lloydminster, Saskatchewan

Sacred Heart Cathedral in Prince Albert, Saskatchewan

United States

Sts. Peter and Paul Catholic Church in Karlsruhe, North Dakota

St. Mary's Catholic Church in Hague, North Dakota

Blessed Trinity Church (formerly the Holy Trinity of Krasna) near Strasburg, North Dakota

Sts. Peter & Paul Roman Catholic Church in Strasburg, North Dakota

First United Church of Christ in Reading, Pennsylvania

St. Peter the Apostle Catholic Church in Reading, Pennsylvania

Church of the Most Blessed Sacrament Bally, Pennsylvania

 St. Paul's United Church of Christ in Schaefferstown, Pennsylvania

Salem United Church of Christ in Oley Township, Berks County, Pennsylvania

Other works by Imhoff in the Reading, Pennsylvania area might still exist at the following locations.
St. John's Catholic Church at Pottsville
St. Mary's Catholic Church at York
German Catholic Church at Hazleton
Catholic Church at Williamsport
Trinity Lutheran Church, Reading
Lithuanian Catholic Church, Mahanoy City
Baptist Church, Reading
Spies's Union Church, Alsace township
Reformed Church, Hazleton
Lutheran Church, Myerstown
St. Paul's Roman Catholic Church, Reading

Videos
Prairie Churches immigrant church artist
Count Berthold Von Imhoff Part 1
Count Berthold Von Imhoff Part 2

References

19th-century German painters
19th-century male artists
German male painters
20th-century German painters
20th-century male artists
19th-century Canadian painters
Canadian male painters
20th-century Canadian painters
Artists from Saskatchewan
German emigrants to Canada
German Roman Catholics
Canadian Roman Catholics
Knights of St. Gregory the Great
1868 births
1939 deaths
Artists from Mannheim
Muralists
Catholic painters